Partička was a Slovak improvisational comedy show strongly inspired by Whose Line Is It Anyway%3F, later brought to the Czech Republic. The Slovak edition started in 2009. Although it saw a big success with the younger generation of viewers, its ratings were never high enough for the commercial television Markíza, which broadcast the show. After several shifts with its timeslot (starting on Monday nights – moved to Saturday nights) the show ended after its fourth season on 31 December 2012. Several Slovak actors have appeared on the show including Juraj Kemka, Lukáš Latinák and Petra Polnišová. 

The show was later brought to the Czech television Prima, where its success slowly grew to a very popular show. Production made several tours across the Czech Republic and organized the summer festival Partička na Vzduchu starring Slovak actors as well. After cancellation on the television channel Prima, production moved to the internet television channel Stream.cz as iPartička and later to Barrandov television as La Parta, but neither was as successful as the original Slovak Partička. The Czech edition later ended on May 27th 2013.

Actors in Slovakian version:

 Daniel Dangl (host)
 Marián Čurko (music effects)
 Juraj Kemka
 Lukáš Latinák
 Marián Miezga
 Róbert Jakab
 Roman Pomajbo
 Petra Polnišová
Many guest appearances

Actors in Czech version:
 Daniel Dangl (host)
 Marián Čurko (music effects)
 Michal Suchánek
 Richard Genzer
 Ondřej Sokol
 Igor Chmela
Guests:
 Lucie Bílá
 Vojtěch Dyk
 Nightwork
 Tatiana Vilhelmová
 Petr Vacek
 Miloš Malý
 Paulina Nakashole

Czech comedy television series
Slovak comedy television series
2009 Slovak television series debuts
2000s Czech television series
2000s Slovak television series
Markíza original programming